The Russian Imperial Guard, officially known as the Leib Guard ( Leyb-gvardiya, from German Leib "body"; cf. Life Guards / Bodyguard) were military units serving as personal guards of the Emperor of Russia. Peter the Great founded the first such units in 1683, to replace the politically motivated Streltsy. The Imperial Guard subsequently increased in size and diversity to become an elite corps of all branches within the Imperial Army rather than Household troops in direct attendance on the Tsar. Numerous links were however maintained with the Imperial family and the bulk of the regiments of the Imperial Guard were stationed in and around Saint Petersburg in peacetime. The Imperial Guard was disbanded in 1917 following the Russian Revolution.

History

Peter the Great first established the two senior units of the eventual Imperial Guard, the Preobrazhensky and Semyonovsky infantry regiments.  Peter formed these two regiments as part of his professionalization of the Russian army after its disastrous defeat by the Swedes at the Battle of Narva, during the early phases of Great Northern War.  He was influenced, too, by his distrust of the Streltsy, who had risen against him repeatedly, both during his childhood (which traumatised him) and during his reign.

Later, Empress Anna formed the Izmailovsky Regiment, recruited from her native Duchy of Courland and Semigallia, out of distrust of the other guard regiments (especially the Preobrazhensky) as a result of her paranoia of losing power. The Izmaylovsky Regiment became the official palace guards during Anna's reign.

But the term "leib" was not used until the reign of Empress Elizabeth during her formation of the Leib Company made up of the grenadiers (especially the Preobrazhensky) who helped put her on the throne.

Revolution of 1905
The Imperial Guard played a key role in suppressing the 1905 Revolution, most particularly at Saint Petersburg on Sunday, 22 (O.S. 9) January 1905 (Bloody Sunday).  The Semyonovsky Regiment subsequently repressed widespread disturbances in Moscow.  However, a full battalion of the Preobrazhensky Regiment mutinied in June 1906.

Russian Revolution of 1917
During the February Revolution of 1917, the garrison of Saint Petersburg included 99,000 soldiers of the Imperial Guard. These were reserve battalions, made up of a mixture of new recruits and veterans from the regiments of the Imperial Guard serving at the front. While generally still recruited from rural districts, the rank and file of the Guards were no longer the reliable instruments of Tsarist autocracy that their predecessors had been during the abortive revolution of 1905.  About 90 percent of the officers of these reserve units were wartime commissioned, often militarily inexperienced and sometimes sympathetic towards the need for political reform.  The overall morale and leadership of the Saint Petersburg troops was poor, although they still enjoyed the status of the historic regiments they represented.

During the early days of rioting in Saint Petersburg, the Semyonovsky, Pavlovsky, and Volinsky Regiments obeyed their officers and fired on the crowds of demonstrators.  But on 27 February, first the Volhynsky, then the Semyonovsky, Moskovsky, and Izmailovsky Regiments defected in large numbers to what had now become a revolution.  Some officers were killed.  An estimated 66,700 guardsmen in the capital had deserted or defected within about two days.  This mass defection from units of the Imperial Guard marked the end of the Tsarist regime.

During the October Revolution, the Pavlovsky Regiment, though celebrated for its actions during the Napoleonic Wars, was one of the first regiments to mutiny and join the Bolsheviks; it then participated in the storming of the Winter Palace.  Much of the former Imperial Guard was still extant in October 1917, retaining their historic titles, though now their role was that of politicised republican soldiers.  In addition to the Pavlovsky, the Semenovsky and Ismailovsky Regiments rallied to the Bolsheviks at a crucial stage in the revolution.

In December 1917, as the Bolsheviks consolidated their power, the remnants of the Imperial Guard were disbanded and integrated into the Red Army. As such they saw combat in the Polish-Soviet War in 1920.

Organization
The final composition of the Russian Imperial Guard at the beginning of 1914 was:

Guards Corps St. Petersburg District. 
Headquarters, St. Petersburg, Millionaya.  (Guards units not part of the Guards Corps were the Guards Replacement Cavalry Regiment and Guards Field Gendarme Squadron.)
 1st Guards Infantry Division. Headquarters,  St. Petersburg, Fontanka
 1st Brigade: Preobrazhensky Life Guards Regiment, Semyonovsky Life Guards Regiment
 2nd Brigade: Izmailovsky Life Guards Regiment, Egersky Life Guards Regiment
 1st Life-Guards Artillery Brigade
 2nd Guards Infantry Division. Headquarters, St. Petersburg, Fontanka
 1st Brigade: Moscow Life Guards Regiment, Grenadier Life Guards Regiment
 2nd Brigade: Pavlovsky Life Guards Regiment, Finliandsky Life Guards Regiment
 2nd Life-Guards Artillery Brigade
 3rd Guards Infantry Division. Headquarters, Warsaw. 
 1st Brigade: Life-Guards Lithuanian Regiment, Emperor of Austria's Life-Guards Kexgolmsky Regiment
 2nd Brigade: King Frederick-William III's Life-Guards St.-Petersburg/Petrograd Regiment, Volinsky Life Guards Regiment
 3rd Life-Guards Artillery Brigade
 2nd Infantry Division
 Separate Guards Cavalry Brigade: His Majesty's Lancers, Grodno Hussars
 3rd Battery of Life-Guards Horse Artillery
 23rd Howitzer Artillery Battalion
 9th Sapper Battalion

 1st Guards Cavalry Division. Headquarters, St. Petersburg, Fontanka
 1st Brigade: Her Sovereign Majesty Empress Maria Theodorovna's Chevalier Guard Regiment, Life Guard Horse Regiment
 2nd Brigade: His Majesty's Life-Guards Cuirassier Regiment, Her Majesty Empress Maria Theodorovna's Life-Guards Cuirassier Regiment
 3rd Brigade: His Majesty's Life-Guards Cossack Regiment, His Imperial Highness the Sovereign Heir and Tsesarevich's Life-Guards Ataman Regiment, Life-Guards Combined Cossack Regiment, 1st His Majesty's Ural Sotnia, 2nd Orenburg Sotnia, 3rd Combined Sotnia, 4th Amur Sotnia
 1st Division of Life-Guards Horse-Artillery Brigade
 2nd Guards Cavalry Division. Headquarters, St. Petersburg, Fontanka
 1st Brigade: Life-Guards Horse-Grenadier Regiment, Her Majesty Empress Alexandra Theodorovna's Life-Guards Lancer Regiment
 2nd Brigade: Life-Guards Dragoon Regiment, His Majesty's Life-Guards Hussar Regiment, 
 2nd Division of Life-Guards Horse-Artillery Brigade
 Guards Rifle Brigade. Headquarters, St. Petersburg, Fontanka
 Life-Guards 1st His Majesty's Rifle Regiment
 Life-Guards 2nd Tsarskoe-Selo Rifle Regiment
 Life-Guards 3rd His Majesty's Rifle Regiment
 Life-Guards 4th The Imperial Family's Rifle Regiment
 Guards Rifle Artillery Battalion
 Life-Guards Horse Artillery
 Guards Howitzer Artillery Battalion
 Life-Guards Sapper Battalion
 Guards Aviation Company

Guard units of direct subordination as of 1917:
 Palace Grenadiers Company 
 Guards Replacement Cavalry Regiment
 Guards Field Gendarme Squadron 
 His Majesty's Own Cossack Escort
 His Majesty's Railway Regiment

Plus the following were part of the 23rd Army Corps, Warsaw Military District. Headquarters, Warsaw, Poland.

 3rd Guards Infantry Division. Headquarters, Warsaw
 Division HQ
 1st Brigade: Life-Guards Lithuania Regiment, Emperor of Austria's Life-Guards Kexholm Regiment
 2nd Brigade: King Frederick-William III's Life-Guards St.-Petersburg Regiment, Volynski Life Guards Regiment
 3rd Life-Guards Artillery Brigade
 Independent Guards Cavalry Brigade
 3rd Battery of Life-Guards Horse Artillery

Ranks

Every soldier and officer of the Guard had the style of the Leib Guard (Лейб-гвардии...), for example: Colonel of the Leib Guard (Лейб-гвардии полковник). It is a misconception that the monarch himself functioned as the commander of the Leib Guard regiments, so only he and some members of the imperial family could hold a title of Colonel (Polkovnik) of the Guards. In fact, there were many guards officers in the rank of colonel.

Commissioned officers enjoyed a two-grade elevation in the Table of Ranks over regular army officers; this later changed to a one-grade elevation—first for the New Guards then for the rest of the Leib Guard. Following the abolition of the rank of Major in 1884, most grades below VII shifted one position upwards, effectively returning to those of the Old Guards.

Basis of selection
From the 18th century onwards the rank and file of the Imperial Guard were picked from each annual intake of conscripts. In peacetime most regiments had a selection criteria based on features of physical appearance such as height, hair-colour etc. The purpose of this tradition was to enhance the uniform appearance of each unit when on parade. As an example, the Semyonovsky Regiment conscripts were picked for their height (tallest of the Guard Infantry), light brown hair and being clean-shaven.

See also
 Imperial guard
 Table of Ranks
 History of Russian military ranks
 Toy army of Peter the Great

References

External links 
 Russian Imperial Guard During the Napoleonic Wars
 THE RUSSIAN ARMY, 1914 by Mark Conrad, 2001. Divisions.

 
17th-century establishments in Russia
Military units and formations disestablished in 1917
Military units and formations established in the 1690s
Military units and formations of the Russian Empire
Royal guards
Russian military units and formations of the Napoleonic Wars